The men's middleweight event was part of the boxing programme at the 1976 Summer Olympics. The weight class allowed boxers of up to 75 kilograms to compete. The competition was held from 19 to 31 July 1976. 19 boxers from 19 nations competed.

Medalists

Results
The following boxers took part in the event:

First round
 Dragomir Vujković (YUG) def. Carlos Betancourt (PUR), 5:0
 David Odwell (GBR) def. Mohamed Saoud (MAR), 5:0
 Bernd Wittenburg (GDR) def. Bryan Gibson (CAN), KO-3
 Luis Felipe Martínez (CUB) def. Fulgencio Obelmejias (VEN), 5:0
 Siraj Din (PAK) def. Nicolas Arredondo (MEX), RSC-3
 Lotti Mwale (ZAM) def. Zakaria Amalemba (KEN), both walk-over
 Ilya Dimitrov (BUL) def. Musa Gariba (GHA), walk-over
 Rufat Riskiyev (URS) def. Jorma Taipale (FIN), KO-3

Second round
 Ryszard Pasiewicz (POL) def. Jean-Pierre Malavasi (FRA), KO-2
 Michael Spinks (USA) def. Jean-Marie Emebe (CMR), walk-over
 Fernando Martins (BRA) def. Matouk Elsadek (LIB), walk-over
 Alec Năstac (ROM) def. Philip McElwaine (AUS), 3:2
 Dragomir Vujković (YUG) def. David Odwell (GBR), 5:0
 Luis Felipe Martínez (CUB) def. Bernd Wittenburg (GDR), 3:2
 Siraj Din (PAK) – Bye
 Rufat Riskiyev (URS) def. Ilya Dimitrov (BUL), 5:0

Quarterfinals
 Michael Spinks (USA) def. Ryszard Pasiewicz (POL), 5:0
 Alec Năstac (ROM) def. Fernando Martins (BRA), 3:2
 Luis Felipe Martínez (CUB) def. Dragomir Vujković (YUG), 5:0
 Rufat Riskiyev (URS) def. Siraj Din (PAK), RSC-2

Semifinals
 Michael Spinks (USA) def. Alec Năstac (ROM), walk-over
 Rufat Riskiyev (URS) def. Luis Felipe Martínez (CUB), 3:2

Final
In the gold medal bout, American rookie Spinks faced the veteran Soviet Rufat Riskiyev, the 1974 World Champion. Riskiyev had defeated Spinks at a match in Tashkent early in 1976, but in the final, Spinks landed a telling body blow in round three, and the referee had to stop the contest, giving Spinks, just 19 years of age, the gold medal.

Spinks, whose brother, Leon, won the light-heavyweight gold medal in Montreal, turned professional. In 1981 he won the WBA light-heavyweight world title by defeating Eddie Mustafa Muhammad. Michael Spinks would hold a version of the light-heavyweight title through 1985 when he moved up to the heavies and defeated Larry Holmes to win the IBF heavyweight crown, the first light-heavyweight champion to move on to become heavyweight world champ. Spinks fought through 1988, winning his first 31 fights, but he retired after losing a heavyweight title fight that year to Mike Tyson.

Riskiyev, who was 27 at the time of the 1976 Olympics, stayed in the amateurs, as the Soviet system did not allow any athletes to turn pro, though he didn’t achieve further success.
 Michael Spinks (USA) def. Rufat Riskiyev (URS), RSC-3

References

Middleweight